Lieutenant Colonel Rupert Charles Ponsonby, 7th Baron de Mauley,  (born 30 June 1957), is a British hereditary peer, former Parliamentary Under-Secretary at the Department for Environment, Food and Rural Affairs and retired Territorial Army officer.

Background and education
Ponsonby was born to Col. Hon. Thomas Maurice Ponsonby, TD, JP, DL (1930–2001), of The Common, Little Faringdon, Lechlade, late Royal Wessex Yeomanry, High Sheriff of Gloucestershire, and his wife Maxine Henrietta (née Thellusson, 1934–2020), daughter of William Dudley Keith Thellusson, of 39, Draycott Place, SW3, of the Brodsworth Hall branch of the family of the Barons Rendlesham. The 5th Baron de Mauley was his paternal grandfather.

He was educated at Eton College, an independent school for boys near Windsor, Berkshire.

Military service
Ponsonby first joined the Territorial Army in 1976, when he was commissioned into the Royal Wessex Yeomanry as a second lieutenant. He was promoted to lieutenant in 1978, major in 1988, and lieutenant-colonel in 2003. In 1988, he was awarded the Efficiency Decoration (Territorial) (TD). He retired in 2005. On 1 June 2011 he was appointed Colonel Commandant Yeomanry, and on 1 July 2015 he became Honorary Colonel of the Royal Wessex Yeomanry.

Peerage
Lord de Mauley succeeded his uncle, the 6th Baron de Mauley, in October 2002. On 10 March 2005, he was declared the winner of a by-election for a Conservative hereditary peers' seat in the House of Lords after the death of Hugh Lawson, 6th Baron Burnham. He was the first peer to have acceded to a title after the House of Lords Act 1999 to have obtained an elective hereditaries' seat in the House.

Political career

He was Parliamentary Under-Secretary at the Department for Environment, Food and Rural Affairs between 2012 and 2015, after taking over from John Taylor, Baron Taylor of Holbeach, who went to the Home Office. He was previously a Government Lord-in-waiting (a position in the Royal Household given to Government Lords whips) and also served as a Shadow Minister for Children, Schools & Families and Energy & Climate Change from 2008 to 2009, and then an opposition whip from 2009 to 2010.

His selection in 2014 to lead UK fisheries talks in the European Union faced certain criticism, given his background as a hereditary peer with no prior experience in this field.

National Pollinator Strategy
In June 2013 de Mauley announced that his department would produce a National Pollinator Strategy. This followed the Bee Cause campaign led by Friends of the Earth and supported by well over 200 MPs for a bee action plan. Leading bee scientists set seven tests to help assess whether the plan is capable of helping pollinators.

Master of the Horse
In July 2018, the Queen appointed Lord de Mauley to succeed Lord Vestey as Master of the Horse. His appointment took effect on 1 January 2019.

Family
Lord de Mauley is married to Lucinda (née Royle), younger daughter of Lord Fanshawe of Richmond.

The heir to the title is his younger brother, the Hon. (Ashley) George Ponsonby, who is married to the former Camilla Gordon-Lennox, née Pilkington.

Notes and references

Notes

References

External links 
 Rupert de Mauley, at Conservatives.com
  Lord De Mauley, political biography, only partially available without subscription; photograph available without subscription.

1957 births
Living people
Conservative Party (UK) hereditary peers
People educated at Eton College
Rupert Ponsonby, 7th Baron de Mauley
Royal Wessex Yeomanry officers
Rupert
Hereditary peers elected under the House of Lords Act 1999